Matin Karimzadeh (born 30 June 1998) is an Iranian footballer who plays as a left back for Iranian club Nassaji Mazandaran in the Persian Gulf Pro League.

References 

Living people
People from Bushehr
Iranian footballers
Esteghlal F.C. players
Pars Jonoubi Jam players
Shahin Bushehr F.C. players
Persian Gulf Pro League players
Association football defenders
1998 births
21st-century Iranian people